Paliampela is a village of the Volvi municipality. Before the 2011 local government reform it was not an officially recognised settlement. The 2011 census recorded 45 inhabitants in the village. Paliampela is a part of the community of Vrasna.

See also
 List of settlements in the Thessaloniki regional unit

References

Populated places in Thessaloniki (regional unit)